White-cheeked bulbul may refer to:

 Himalayan bulbul, a species of bird found in central and south Asia
 White-eared bulbul, a species of bird found in south-western Asia

Birds by common name